The Blue Mouse and the Big Faced Cat is a Chinese animated series from mainland China. Based on Ge Bing's fairy tale 'The Blue Mouse and the Big Faced Cat'. The first part was produced in 1993 and the second in 2000. It traced in an American cartoon TV series: Tom and Jerry.

Background
It was voted one of China's top 10 domestic animations in 2006.

Story
A humorous tale of laughter and mischief between the star duo of the Magic Circus, the Blue Mouse and the Big-Faced Cat.Blue Mouse is clever and helpful, while Big-Faced Cat is greedy, lazy, and charmingly naïve. Along with two beetles, Jin Doudou and Lu Fanfang, this dynamic duo has many adventures.

References

External links
 CCTV Guide on The Blue Mouse and the Big-Faced Cat

1993 Chinese television series debuts
2000 Chinese television series endings
Chinese children's animated comedy television series
China Central Television original programming
Animated television series about cats
Animated television series about mice and rats
Mandarin-language television shows